Lionel Town is a settlement in the Clarendon parish of Jamaica. It has a population of 5,416 as of 2009.  Lionel Town has a Community Hospital. The town is named after the British colonial administrator General Sir Lionel Smith who was the island's governor at the time of emancipation in 1836.

References

Populated places in Clarendon Parish, Jamaica